The Battle of Munford took place in Munford, Alabama, on Sunday, April 23, 1865, during the raid through the state by 1,500 Union Army cavalrymen under General John T. Croxton, part of the force participating in Wilson's Raid. The Battle of Munford and a minor action at Hendersonville, North Carolina on the same day were the last battles of the American Civil War east of the Mississippi River.

The Confederate soldiers in the battle were described as convalescents, home guards, and pardoned deserters, while the Union cavalry was a veteran force armed with 7-shot Spencer repeating carbines. The Confederates were commanded by General Benjamin Jefferson Hill. Lieutenant Lewis E. Parsons had two cannons which fired several rounds before they were overrun. The Union troops won the brief battle. Parsons was appointed provisional governor of Alabama in June after the war's end.

The Union and Confederate soldiers killed that day are described by author Rex Miller as the last to die in open combat by contending military forces.

Andrew Jackson Buttram was the last Confederate soldier to die in battle east of the Mississippi River. He served as a Lieutenant in the Confederate Army and was killed at the Battle of Munford.

References

Further reading

Armes, Ethel, The Story of Coal and Iron in Alabama (1910).  See sections on the Knight Furnace (Choccolocco Ironworks), Oxford Furnace, and Salt Creek Ironworks.
Woodward, Joseph H., Alabama Blast Furnaces (2007, originally published in 1940).
Hughes, William Edgar, A Lincoln Man in the Rebel Army (2016, originally published in 1912).

 

Munford
Munford
1865 in the American Civil War
Munford
Talladega County, Alabama
History of Alabama
1865 in Alabama
April 1865 events